Try this One for Size (also known as Sauf votre respect) is a 1989 French film directed by Guy Hamilton and starring Michael Brandon and David Carradine. It is based on a 1980 novel of the same name by James Hadley Chase.

Premise
An insurance investigator searches for a priceless medieval Russian icon stolen by a master thief.

Cast
Michael Brandon as Tom Lepski
David Carradine as Bradley
Arielle Dombasle as Maggie
Guy Marchand as Ottovioni
Mario Adorf as Radnitz
Peter Bowles as Igor

References

External links

1989 films
Films based on works by James Hadley Chase
Films based on British novels
Films directed by Guy Hamilton
French detective films
English-language French films
Films scored by Claude Bolling
1980s English-language films
1980s French films